Vaughan Allison (born 1983) is a cafe owner, model, teacher, music promoter, and coffee personality based in Tokyo, Japan. He is best known for his work touring international artists throughout Japan, writing about coffee and modeling and for co-founding Mia Mia cafe in Higashi Nagasaki.

Early life 
Vaughan was born on February 11, 1983, at Saint Vincent's Private Hospital in Melbourne, where he grew up with his parents and brother, musician Martin Martini.

He first came to Japan in 2001, where he studied an accelerated program at Ritsumeikan Asia Pacific University where he obtained a Bachelor of Business Administration and graduated in 2003.

Career 
In 2003 Vaughan returned to Australia and started his own music management company Red Balloon Artist Management. Through Red Balloon Artist Management, worked with his brother's outfit Martin Martini and The Bone Palace Orchestra, which saw the team go on three Australian national tours, make appearances at the Corner Hotel, National Gallery of Victoria, Sydney Opera House, and perform an overseas season at London's Soho Theatre in 2008. In 2009 he returned to Japan and started working in the music industry, modeling and teaching at Tokyo fashion college Bunka.

Music industry 
His work as a promoter and booker has seen him tour various Australian artists throughout Japan, including The Lagerphones, Grand Salvo, The Twoks, The Harpoons, Sunnyside (who played Fuji Rock 2019), Owl Eyes, and Oliver Mann.

He has also worked as an on-site, Japan-based fixer for artists such as Hiatus Kaiyote and Blue King Brown, among others, and booked a debut Australia tour for Kyoto outfit Zahatorte in 2019. The tour with Zahatorte included shows at Northcote Social Club and Mona Museum and appearances on live radio ABC Hobart, SBS Sydney, and 3CR Melbourne.

In August 2021, Vaughan invited Kyoto-based artist YeYe (10 million hits on YouTube) to hold two sold-out shows at Mia Mia and one show at Convenience Store Takahashi.

Coffee industry 
Vaughan has long been an enthusiastic and leading member of Tokyo's coffee community. He's worked as a commentator, writer, event organizer, emcee, and judge for competitions showcasing Japan's coffee community.

As a writer and curator, he's promoted various coffee shops and baristas through multiple media channels, including Casa BRUTUS Magazine and online media like lifestyle web magazine Harumari and Signpost, where he published pieces on Koffee MameyaA and Chatei Hatou. Vaughan was also invited to curate and write the Tokyo City Profile for specialty coffee magazine Standart.

Working with Good Coffee online magazine, he built the @goodcoffeeme Instagram's following from 100 to 50,000 followers in three years. He was also one of the Tokyo Coffee Festival's key members - producing the 2018 spring festival, which was one of the most attended (40,000 attendees over two days) Tokyo Coffee Festivals in history.

In 2016, Vaughan released a limited edition book titled 29 cafes 23 photographers 5 baristas 1 illustrator and a lot of coffee with Vaughan.

He worked with Miki Suzuki as her English coach during her time at the World Barista Championship in Seoul in 2017, in which she placed 2nd in the world. He's also been the emcee at the Latte Art Championships in 2018 and 2019, as well as a judge at other competitions like the Tokyo Matcha Latte Art Competition in 2019.

From 2021, Vaughan started working with Bushmills Whiskey to promote their presence in the café industry.

Modeling 
As a model, Vaughan has worked with Wrangler, Kishin Shinoyama, Tomoki Sukezane, Uniqlo UT (wearing Jean-Michel Basquiat), Takashi Kumagai, and Kashiyama. He's made regular appearances in magazines such as UOMO, Houyhnhnm, Brutus, Popeye, Tokyo Calendar, and Fukuoka's Bond Magazine. He has done catalog work for Beams, United Arrows, Urban Research, Phlannel and Espionage (Korea), promotional work for Zoff, and mobile phone company au. Since 2013 he's worked as a lecturer at Bunka Fashion College.

Mia Mia Cafe 
In 2020, Vaughan opened cafe Mia Mia with his wife, architect Rie Allison. Mia Mia is located in the Tokyo neighborhood of Higashi Nagasaki, Toshima, on Seibu Ikebukuro Line. The cafe specializes in local and Australian import coffee and wine.

Mia Mia was featured on the cover of Popeye Magazine's May 2021 Tokyo Annai issue which included a two-page feature on Vaughan's guide to Higashi Nagasaki. Vaughan was featured once again in Popeye's November 2021 issue, "coffee and travel." The issue featured two shops that inspired Vaughan and Mia Mia, Shozo in Tochigi, and Senkiya in Kawaguchi. The magazine also created a tie up promotion with H&M.

Mia Mia was featured in the Monocle book of entrepreneurs (released November 2021) as one of 100 successful businesses worldwide, and on the cover of Coffee Time (コーヒ時間) Magazine, issue winter 2021.

Vaughan and Mia Mia have also been featured in a tie-up promotion with Audio Technica earphones. The video by Yoko Takahashi, has around 300,000 hits on Youtube. In September 2021, Casa Brutus also featured Mia Mia in a promotional shoot with Mini Cooper.

I Am Tokyo Gallery and Kiosk 

Vaughan, together with his wife Rie Alison, Vaughan opened   a cultural kiosk/ gallery in the Higashi Nagasaki area. They work with Australian artists in showcasing their work. They worked with artists Sophia Emmett, Lightly, Seljak, Posie, and Togetherness in their first year.

Coffee Time with Vaughan Brand 
In April 2021, Vaughan launched his official handkerchief brand, Coffee Time With Vaughan. Produced in collaboration with 100-year-old handkerchief company Intermode Kawabe, and Japanese artists Mariya Suzuki and Yuko Saeki, the first series featured Koffee Mameya and 100-year old Kyoto kissaten Rokuyosha. The brand officially launched at Isetan Shinjuku 1st floor, with pop-up stores around the country, including Kyoto Daimaru and nationwide select shops such as Loft.

The second volume 2022/April - features a collaboration with Blue Bottle Coffee (designed by Ryuto Miyake) and Chatei Hatou (designed by Yosuke Kinoshita).

References

1983 births
Living people
Australian male models